Prvoslav is a Serbian masculine given name first attested in the Middle Ages. It derives from prvo ("first") and slava ("glory, fame") and is thus commonly given to the firstborn child.

It may refer to:

 , Serbian politician of the Council of Ministers of Serbia and Montenegro
 Prvoslav Dragićević, Serbian footballer
 Prvoslav Ilić, Serbian wrestler who competed in the 1980 Summer Olympics
 Prvoslav Mihajlović, Serbian footballer
 Prvoslav Vujčić, Serbian writer
 Prvoslav Radojević, Serbian nobleman

See also 
 Pribislav of Serbia

References 

Serbian masculine given names